The Royal Latin School (RLS) is a co-educational grammar school in Buckingham, England. It has continually existed for over six hundred years; receiving a Royal Charter in this time and moving premises three times. In September 2011 the school became an academy. It takes children from the age of 11 through to the age of 18 and has over 1260 pupils, including a sixth form of 390 pupils. It maintains a staff of just over 160. In September 2003 the school was designated by the Department for Education and Skills (DfES) as a specialist school in science. It was successfully re-designated in 2007 and achieved a second specialism as a training school.

Since the county's boundary adjustments of 1974 placed Eton College in Berkshire, the Royal Latin School claims the distinction of being the sole Pre-Reformation grammar school in the county. The Royal Latin School was graded as outstanding in the 2009 report by OFSTED.

History
The school's earliest recorded reference occurs in 1423. A very small establishment at first, the school taught only six poor boys.

Although Buckingham's citizens supported Catherine of Aragon and her daughter Mary Tudor, and were opposed to the Reformation, the Chantry Chapel in which the Royal Latin School was based, rather than being destroyed by Edward VI (as many similar establishments were) was instead converted into the Royal Latin School. King Edward VI granted a charter for the school, for 30-40 pupils, in 1548 with an endowment of £10 and with 12 trustees. A major fire in 1696 destroyed the Master's House which was rebuilt by Alexander Denton, complete with a garden.

The Chantry Chapel dedicated to St John the Baptist and Thomas a Beckett had an original Romanesque doorway, it served as the main schoolroom.  Early 19th century Master was Oxford-educated aristocrat Rev William Eyre, MA vicar of Padbury.  It remained the home of the Royal Latin School until 1907 when Buckinghamshire County Council provided major new buildings for the school in Chandos Road, now the site of Grenville School and did so again in 1963, when the school moved to Brookfield House, formerly The Mount. Numerous extensions in 1963 were opened by Queen Elizabeth the Queen Mother, with further extensions being gradually added over the next few decades. The warm brown brickwork of the 1963 extensions complements the stone-built structure of the earlier buildings, the whole is enhanced by its parkland setting on the outskirts of Buckingham. Brookfield House and its grounds have been expanded over recent years to accommodate the growing size of the school and the fact that many of the older buildings, given the larger number of students, were becoming inadequate for use on such a large scale.

In 2006, the U15 rugby side made school history by becoming the first side from the Royal Latin to reach the semi-finals of the Daily Mail Vase, the English schools' annual rugby union cup competition. The U15s surpassed this record in 2013 reaching the final at Twickenham Stadium, where they beat Felsted School 19-13 to win the vase.
The U13 girls' team (rugby) won girls nationals in 2015 and were unbeaten in the 2017-18 season.

In 2015, the first of three projects known as the 'RLS 600 Campaign' was completed. This was a two-storey science laboratory with 13 classrooms for expanding further the knowledge of sciences for the students. The next two projects will be a Sports Campus, and an Arts department, built before the 600th anniversary of the Royal Latin, in 2023.

In February 2017, a 'no phone' policy was introduced to the school.

School buildings
Brookfield House: Formerly the boys' boarding house. A former hunting lodge that houses the school offices and reception, the school library, conference room, art department, music department and some science and drama laboratories and rooms.

Rotherfield House: Formerly the girls' boarding house. A lodge that houses the Sixth Form classrooms, common room, etc., in addition to the school lecture theatre, school archives, a computer suite and alumni rooms and offices.

Main Block: Built-in 1963 by Fred Pooley CBE, this houses the school hall, old gymnasium, stage (both indoor and outdoor) and drama department, student reception, school offices, English department, humanities department and the dining room.

Technology Block: Also built-in 1963 by the same architect, this houses the technology department, including cooking rooms, wood and metal workshops and classrooms.

Former Science Block: Now used by the SCITT for teaching training.

New Block: This building, built-in 2001, houses the mathematics department, the languages department, the economics and business studies department and some science laboratories.

Sports Hall: Built-in 2003 on the site of the headmaster's garden outside Brookfield House, this houses the PE department which also use the old gym.

Discovery Centre: A 12-classroom building dedicated to the sciences that also contains conference rooms, completed in 2015, as part one of the 600 campaign.  The building was officially opened on 2 October 2015 by Robert Winston and John Bercow.

The school regularly uses the church of St Peter and St Paul's in Buckingham for its annual carol service and Founder's Day service, which is held on the feast day of St John, the patron saint of the school. The church is also used for various concerts throughout the year.

The Chantry Chapel, the school's former chapel, is now owned by the National Trust and is too small to accommodate the entire school, thus necessitating the transfer of all school religious ceremonies to the parish church.

Organisation

Houses
Each pupil, upon entrance, is placed into one of six houses, named after founders of the school at various stages in its history. The six houses are:

Headmasters and headmistress

Old Latins

 Mary Pix, 17th century novelist and playwright
 Cecil Gardner, World War I Royal Air Force pilot
 Shan Morgan, CMG, diplomat and former ambassador to Argentina
 Air Vice-Marshal Julian Young, CB OBE, Royal Air Force officer
 Craig Pickering, Olympic athlete
 Dan Jones, writer
 Sam Baldock, footballer
 George Baldock, footballer

See also
List of the oldest schools in the United Kingdom
List of the oldest schools in the world
List of English and Welsh endowed schools (19th century)

Footnotes

References
Kettler, Sarah Valente. Trimble, Carole. The Amateur Historians Guide to the Heart of England: Nearly 200 Medieval & Tudor Sites: nearly 200 Medieval & Tudor sites two hours or less from London

External links

Department for Education School Performance Tables 2011

Grammar schools in Buckinghamshire
Academies in Buckinghamshire
Training schools in England
1423 establishments in England
Buckingham
Educational institutions established in the 15th century
 
Schools with a royal charter